NGC 4647 is an intermediate spiral galaxy estimated to be around 63 million light-years away in the constellation of Virgo. It was discovered by astronomer William Herschel on March 15, 1784. NGC 4647 is listed along with Messier 60 as being part of a pair of galaxies called Arp 116; their designation in Halton Arp's Atlas of Peculiar Galaxies. The galaxy is located on the outskirts of the Virgo Cluster.

Interaction with Messier 60
In optical images, the two galaxies' disks overlap. This has suggested an ongoing interaction, however images do not reveal any signs of star formation which would have been caused by a tidal interaction between the two galaxies. Recent studies of Hubble images made in 2012 of the two galaxies indicate that tidal interactions between the two have just begun.

Interstellar medium of NGC 4647
The gas in NGC 4647 has been mildly disturbed. The galaxy's location in the Virgo Cluster suggests that might it suffered an effect known as ram-pressure stripping caused by the intracluster medium. Another explanation may be hot gas in the halo of Messier 60. The hot gas in Messier 60 may have increased the pressure of gas on the eastern side of NGC 4647 through either ram-pressure striping or a bow-shock between the two galaxies causing the observed asymmetry of gas in the galaxy. The difficulty is that the galaxies would have to be so close that tidal forces from Messier 60 would cause the disk of NGC 4647 to get ripped apart.

Supernovae
On January 25, 1979 a supernova 1979A was discovered in NGC 4647.

On 16 April 2022, a Type Ia supernova 2022hrs was discovered.

See also 
 List of NGC objects (4001–5000)
 NGC 4567 and NGC 4568
 Arp 116

References

External links

Spiral galaxies
Overlapping galaxies
Interacting galaxies
Virgo (constellation)
4647
42816
7896
116
Astronomical objects discovered in 1784
Virgo Cluster